Eugenio Consolini (15 May 1913 in Brazil – 20 April 20 1996 in São Fidélis, Brazil) was an Italian noble.

Consolini was the son of Adriano Giuseppe Gaetano Consolini, of the marquises of Consolini, and Teresa Tonello.  He was also the nephew of Cardinal Domenico Consolini. Consolini was born in Brazil his father having moved there from Terni, Italy in 1898 due to the persecutions against ecclesiastical nobles after the Italian unification.

On his father's death, Consolini inherited the title of Marquis of Monte Verde but lived anonymously in the Brazilian countryside. He refused to fight against Italy during World War II which resulted in him being forbidden to be present at his mother burial on 4 February 4 1942.

Consolini was married to Cecilia Bauer. He died in São Fidélis, Brazil on 20 April 1996 and was buried on 21 April 1996.

Genealogy of the Marquises of Consolini

Tommaso Consolini - Marquis of Senigaglia, vice consul of France in Senigaglia
Pietro Consolini, son of Tommaso Consolini, appointed Marquis of Senigaglia by Pope Gregory XVI in 1842
Sabatino Consolini, son of Pietro Consolini, Marquis of Senigaglia
Adriano Giuseppe Gaetano Consolini, Marquis of Senigaglia
Eugenio Consolini, Marquis of Monte Verde

References

1913 births
1996 deaths
Italian people of Brazilian descent